Sotirios Zarianopoulos (1961) is a Greek communist politician. He was elected a Member of the European Parliament in the 2014 European elections for the Communist Party of Greece.

References

Living people
1961 births
MEPs for Greece 2014–2019
Communist Party of Greece MEPs
Politicians from Thessaloniki